James Gates Jr. may refer to:

Sylvester James Gates (born 1950), American theoretical physicist
James M. Gates Jr. (1935–2004), American military person